The Eballistraceae are a family of smut fungi in the Basidiomycota, class Exobasidiomycetes. This is a monotypic family, containing the single genus Eballistra, species of which have a widespread distribution in tropical regions.

References 

Ustilaginomycotina
Monotypic Basidiomycota genera
Fungal plant pathogens and diseases
Basidiomycota families
Taxa named by Franz Oberwinkler